Buda Hosmer Brown (June 10, 1894 – August 12, 1962) was a political figure in British Columbia. She represented Vancouver-Point Grey in the Legislative Assembly of British Columbia from 1956 to 1962 as a Social Credit member.

She was born Buda Hosmer Jenkins in Bellingham, Washington, the daughter of William D. Jenkins, and later married Donald Cameron Brown. She served eight years as a Vancouver Parks commissioner. Brown ran unsuccessfully as a Progressive Conservative candidate in the federal riding of Vancouver—Burrard in 1953 before being elected to the provincial assembly as a member of the Social Credit party. Brown served in the provincial cabinet as minister without portfolio. She died in office at the age of 68.

References 

1894 births
1962 deaths
British Columbia Social Credit Party MLAs
Women government ministers of Canada
Members of the Executive Council of British Columbia
Politicians from Bellingham, Washington
Women MLAs in British Columbia
Progressive Conservative Party of Canada candidates for the Canadian House of Commons
Candidates in the 1953 Canadian federal election
20th-century Canadian women politicians
American emigrants to Canada